Rhosddu Halt railway station was a station in Rhosddu, Wrexham, Wales. The station was opened in July 1906 and closed on 1 March 1917. Used by workmen until about 1923.

References

Disused railway stations in Wrexham County Borough
Railway stations in Great Britain opened in 1906
Railway stations in Great Britain closed in 1917
Former Great Central Railway stations